An asymptote is a line that a curve approaches as the independent variable tends to some value.

Asymptote may also refer to:
 Asymptote Architecture, an architectural design firm
 Asymptote (journal), an online magazine featuring literature translations

Science and Technology
 Asymptote (vector graphics language)
 Asymptotic analysis, a method for describing limiting behaviour
 Asymptotic computational complexity, in theory of computation
 Asymptotic curve, a concept in differential geometry
 Asymptotology, which studies limiting cases in applied mathematical systems
 Asymptotic expansion
 Method of matched asymptotic expansions, a method in mathematics for computing the solution to a singularly perturbed problem such as a boundary layer in a fluid flow